Sarit Kumar Das is an Institute professor of the department of mechanical engineering at IIT Madras. He also held the position of Dean (Academic Research) at Indian Institute of Technology Madras. He was the Director at IIT Ropar. His research varies from a wide range of Heat transfer applications like nanofluids, biological heat transfer microfluidics and nanoparticle mediated drug delivery in cancer cells. He is an elected fellow of National Academy of Sciences, India (NASI) and Indian National Academy of Engineering (FNAE).

Education
He received his bachelor's degree and master's degrees from the Department of Mechanical Engineering at Jadavpur University, Kolkata, India in 1984 and 1987 respectively. He defended his PhD in 1994, from the Sambalpur University, Odisha, India. He joined as post-doc fellow at Helmut Schmidt University, Hamburg from 1994 to 1995.

Work
Prof. Das joined as an assistant professor at the Department of Mechanical Engineering, Indian Institute of Technology Madras in 1995. He was the group leader at Heat Transfer and Thermal Power Lab. He is associated with Department of Mechanical Engineering, Indian Institute of Technology Ropar as a professor. He also serves as the editor-in-chief of the International Journal of Micro/Nanoscale Transport

Awards and honors
Alexander von Humboldt Professorship (2000)
Prof. K. N. Seetharamu Award & Medal for Excellence in Research (2006)
Peabody Visiting Professor, MIT, Cambridge, Massachusetts (2011)
India Citation Award conferred by Thomson Reuters (2012)

Selected bibliography

Books

Patents
Thermodynamic balancing of combined heat and mass exchange devices

Articles

References

Living people
Jadavpur University alumni
Sambalpur University alumni
Academic staff of IIT Madras
Indian Institute of Technology directors
Year of birth missing (living people)
West Bengal academics
Engineers from West Bengal